Fabrikoid, patented in October 1915, is a brand of artificial leather manufactured by DuPont.

Material
Fabrikoid consists of cotton cloth coated with pyroxylin (a less nitrated nitrocellulose, dissolved in castor oil, alcohol, benzene and amyl acetate). Fabrikoid has been used for luggage, bookbinding, upholstery and dress trimmings.

History
In 1910, DuPont purchased Newburgh, New York's  Fabrikoid Company.

By the 1920s Fabrikoid was used heavily in both automobile seat covers and the tops of convertible automobiles.

Gilbert Rohde conducted some of the early experiments on its uses in upholstery.

Further reading
Robert Kanigel  FAUX REAL: Genuine Leather and 200 Years of Inspired Fakes. Washington D.C.: Joseph Henry Press, 2007.
Meikle, Jeffrey L. “Presenting a New Material: From Imitation to Innovation with Fabrikoid.” The Journal of the Decorative Arts Society 1850 - the Present, no. 19 (1995): 8–15.

References

External links

Artificial leather
DuPont products